Ennedi-Ouest Region is one of the twenty-three regions of Chad.

It was created in 2012 from the western half of the former Ennedi Region. It appears to cover the same territory as the former Ennedi Ouest Department. The capital of the region is Fada.

Geography
The region borders Libya to the north, Ennedi-Est Region to the east, Wadi Fira Region to the south, and Borkou Region to the west. The region is geographically part of the Sahara Desert.

The region's northern border lies within the Aouzou Strip, historically a point of dispute between Chad and Libya.

Settlements
The regional capital is Fada; other major settlements include Gouro, Kalait, Nohi and Ounianga Kébir.

Demographics
The region's population is estimated to be 59,744. The main ethnolinguistic groups are the Tedaga and Dazaga Toubou and the Zaghawa.

Subdivisions
Ennedi-Ouest Region is divided into two departments:

Government
The region's current governor is Mornadji Mbaïssanébé Kar-Ouba, who previously served as a general in the Chadian Air Force and as governor of Moyen-Chari Region.

References

Regions of Chad
 
States and territories established in 2012